Graham Nathaniel Higham (24 January 1928 – 19 December 1988) was an Australian boxer. He competed in the men's middleweight event at the 1948 Summer Olympics. At the 1948 Summer Olympics, he lost in his opening fight, to Johnny Wright of Great Britain.

References

1928 births
1988 deaths
Australian male boxers
Olympic boxers of Australia
Boxers at the 1948 Summer Olympics
Middleweight boxers